Vizefeldwebel Wilhelm "Willi" Stör (10. May 1893 – 12 December 1977) was a World War I flying ace credited with five aerial victories.

Biography

Wilhelm Stör was born  on 5 October 1893 in Witten, Germany.

After serving in a Hussar Regiment of the Imperial German Army in World War I he transferred to the Luftstreitkrafte (Imperial German Flying Corps), he then became a fighter pilot with Jagdstaffel 68 and was credited with shooting down three aircraft and two observation balloons. He was awarded the Iron Cross for his actions.

In the interwar period he became a stunt pilot and aerobatic instructor. He was then a pilot at the Deutsche Verkehrsfliegerschule (DVS—German Air Transport School) and won the German master aerobatic contest in 1935 and 1936 flying a BFW M.35 monoplane (serial D-EQAN) with a distinctive 'sun-burst' livery  which he also demonstrated in other countries. He was then appointed the chief test pilot for Messerschmitt at their factory in Augsburg and was notable for tutoring Rudolf Hess to fly Messerschmitt aircraft including the Bf 108 and the Bf 110 (radio code VJ+OQ) that he flew to Scotland in 1941. Stör was directed to deliver two Bf 109 fighters to Kawasaki, Japan in May 1941 and his colleague Helmut Kaden then took over as the flying instructor to Hess.

Sources of information

References
 Above the Lines: The Aces and Fighter Units of the German Air Service, Naval Air Service and Flanders Marine Corps, 1914–1918. Norman Franks, Frank W. Bailey, Russell Guest. Grub Street, 1993. , .

 The Flight of Rudolph Hess Myths and Reality. Ray Conyers Nesbit and Georges van Acker, 1999. 

1893 births
1977 deaths
German World War I flying aces
Luftstreitkräfte personnel
Recipients of the Iron Cross (1914), 1st class
People from Witten
People from the Province of Westphalia
Military personnel from North Rhine-Westphalia